Until the End is the third EP by Japanese rock band Coldrain, released on June 18, 2014 in Japan.

Track listing

Personnel
  – lead vocals, producer
  – lead guitar, steel guitar, programming, producer
  – rhythm guitar, backing vocals
  – bass guitar, backing vocals
  – drums, percussion, steel drum

Charts

References

2014 EPs
Coldrain EPs
Albums produced by Masato Hayakawa